Ultrafast scanning electron microscopy (UFSEM) is an innovative consolidated facility that combines two microscopic modalities, Pump-probe microscopy and Scanning electron microscope, to gather temporal and spatial resolution phenomena. In fact, this technique is very wonderful at which  ultrashort laser will be used for pump excitation of the material and the sample response will be detected by an Everhart-Thornley detector. Acquiring data depends mainly on formation of images by raster scan mode after pumping with short laser pulse at different delay times. The characterization of the output image will be done through the temporal resolution aspect. Thus, the idea is to exploit the shorter DeBroglie wavelength in respect to the photons which has great impact to increase the resolution about 1 nm. That technique is an up-to-date approach to study the dynamic of charge on material surfaces.

Time resolved in scanning electron spectroscopy

Ernst Ruska was a pioneer German scholar who won the Nobel prize in 1986. He is considered a spiritual father of existence of electron microscope in 1933 with collaboration with Max Knoll. Nowadays, the electron microscopy is miscellaneous used tool due to enhancement not only the spatial resolution respect to the optical microscope but also high imaging contrast and remarkable sensitivity due to the fact that the robustness of electrons impact on the matter in comparison with photons. Proceeding from that concept, the technology of ultrafast scanning electron microscopy has been modified by assistance of Ultrashort pulse laser which allows the scientists to investigate material dynamic in short and ultra-short scale of time. There was an early attempt to initiate this technique by Larry D.Flesner in a US patent in 1990, he incorporated the scanning electron microscopy and modulated light to study semiconductor surface photovoltaic in both time and space scale. Nowadays, pump-probe microscopy has been improved after  Ahmed Zewail's discovery of femtosecond time scale for chemical reaction and has awarded the Nobel Prize for his historical discovery.

Scanning electron microscopy 

Scanning electron microscopy is a powerful technique to give full reliable mapping of sample surface topography and material content in very wide range metal, semiconductor even organic samples and always operates in vacuum environment. The main operation idea depends on the production of a primary beam by cathode which passes through electron column. That column contains a series of electromagnetic lenses that focus the intensity of the beam and by this process, the primary beam reaches the specimen in few nanometers size. In principle, if the thickness of the sample is within few micrometers, the primary beam will be completely attenuated by scattering with other electrons or lattices. In fact, the primary beam interaction process could be elastic or inelastic. For the first case, no loss of energy happens, this is known as a backscattered electron. On the other hand, in case of inelastic interaction process, the emitted electron from the sample from eV to 30 KeV. The excitation might be deep core hole excitation or electron hole production. The shown picture summarizes all kinds of possible interactions and their related depth to the sample. For example, the x-ray generated from long depth or an Auger electron generated at the surface. So, depending on the energy emitted from the sample, specific detectors will be used in accordance with emitted energy. The final image, acquired and reconstructed by raster scan mode, it is acquired in grayscale. Due to the fact that the emission of secondary electrons is less than 50 eV which in fact has been collected due to inelastic collision from all the volume of interaction with the specimen but only ones near to the surface can be detected. Therefore, secondary electron emission considers highly sensitive to the surface due to its generation occurs from just nanometers of depth. The sample itself plays an important role in emission depending on the local work function of the sample. These factors have nominated the SEM to be much more affordable facility in micro and nano scale regimes.

Pump probe microscopy 

Pump-probe microscopy phenomenon, widely known as transient absorption microscopy, is a sort of nonlinear process starting by excitation of the material by very short pulse laser beam (pump), which induces internal transition. A probe beam follows the pump beam to trace the progress that has been done inside the material also in very short time. In reality, that response could be changed by manipulating the time delay between pump and probe and by this way the concept of Time-resolved spectroscopy will be used to trace dynamic process evolution as a function of time. 
 Nowadays, the appreciated impact to reach high progress in that phenomenon is directly coming from the nonlinear optics. There are many ways for nonlinear process interaction, for example second-harmonic generation, Coherent anti-Stokes Raman or two-photon-excited fluorescence. 
The fascinating in Ultrafast scanning electron microscopy is how powerful it obtains by combining high spatial resolution of the electrons and temporal resolution of ultra-fast pump-probe microscopy.

Measurement methodology 
The fundamental idea that measurement has been built to exploit the Spatial resolution of electron microscopy and temporal resolution for ultrafast optical pump probe. The setup simply consists of scanning electron microscopy machine always works in ultra-high vacuum that regarding on electron beam as a probe and ultrashort laser beam as pump. Firstly, Schottky emission gun is almost common to use as source of primary beam due to high  beam brightness after passing through electromagnetic lens.  Secondly, femtosecond Powerful fibre laser with repetition rates from KHZ to few of MHz splits by nonlinear process into third and fourth harmonic generation 343 nm and 257 nm, respectively. During the measurement, the tip emission is less than thermal emission limit to acquire photoemission mode. That photoemission mode improves by allow forth harmonic generation beam to interact the tip which generates more electrons. On the other hand, another third harmonic generation will be used to excite the sample itself. The time-resolved measurement will be acquired by detecting the secondary electron emission in image shape at different delay time between third and fourth harmonic beam. The final acquired intensity must be normalized by subtraction from the background. It is important to acquire the measurement at different delay time forward and reverse that a good tool for checking the stability and reproducibility.

Applications
The powerfulness of that technique meets the requirement for investigation of innovative materials for electronics, sustainable energy harvesting and photonics that enables us to study the charge dynamic in deep for semiconductors materials which have been stimulated by ultrashort laser beam. It has powerful accessibility to carrier recombination and trapping in condensed matter physics that allows more progress in photovoltaics fabrication.

See also

 Time-resolved mass spectrometry   
 Terahertz time-domain spectroscopy
 Ultrafast laser spectroscopy      
 Surface states
 Attophysics
 Femtotechnology

References

External links
Ultrafast Scanning Electron Microscopy (USEM)-Dipartimento di Fisica - Politecnico di Milano
Aesthetic look on quantum mechanics 
Introduction to multiphoton microscopy
World Leading University to Advance Science and Technology for the Prosperity of Humankind

Microscopes
Scientific techniques
Laboratory techniques in condensed matter physics
Semiconductors